Donald Dering Djoussé  (born 18 March 1990) is a Cameroonian football player.

Career

Club
He has netted nine league goals for Tbilisi; seven of these have been scored from bicycle kicks, a skill in which he specializes. He scored twice in the 7–1 home win against FC Samtredia on 11 March 2011.

In July 2011, he joined Polish club Pogoń Szczecin on a three-year contract.

On the last day of the winter 2015–16 transfer window, Djoussé signed a two-and-a-half-year with Portuguese side C.S. Marítimo.

On 18 July 2017, Djousse joined Académica de Coimbra in a season-long loan. After his contract with the Verde-Rubros expired, Djoussé signed a permanent deal with Académica de Coimbra.

Personal life
Djousse is only a Cameroonian citizen. His parents were both born in Cameroon and his biological grandfather (on his mother's side of the family) was born in Cameroon.

References

External links
 
 
 
 
 

1990 births
Living people
Cameroonian footballers
Cameroonian people of Nigerien descent
Cameroon international footballers
Association football forwards
FC Dinamo Tbilisi players
Mount Cameroon F.C. players
Pogoń Szczecin players
Primeira Liga players
Liga Portugal 2 players
C.S. Marítimo players
Associação Académica de Coimbra – O.A.F. players
Expatriate footballers in Georgia (country)
Cameroonian expatriate footballers
Cameroonian expatriate sportspeople in Poland
Cameroonian expatriate sportspeople in Portugal
Expatriate footballers in Poland
Expatriate footballers in Portugal
Cameroon under-20 international footballers
MKP Pogoń Siedlce players